The Erythraean Sibyl was the prophetess of classical antiquity presiding over the Apollonian oracle at Erythrae, a town in Ionia opposite Chios, which was built by Neleus, the son of Codrus.

The word Sibyl comes (via Latin) from the ancient Greek word sibylla, meaning prophetess. Sibyls would give answers whose value depended upon good questions — unlike prophets, who typically answered with responses indirectly related to questions asked.

Presumably there was more than one sibyl at Erythrae.  One is recorded as having been named Herophile.  At least one is said to have been from Chaldea, a nation in the southern portion of Babylonia, being the daughter of Berossus (who wrote the Chaldean history) and Erymanthe.  Apollodorus of Erythrae, however, says that one who was his own countrywoman predicted the Trojan War and prophesied to the Greeks both that Troy would be destroyed and that Homer would write falsehoods.

The term acrostic has been applied to the prophecies of the Erythraean Sibyl, which were written on leaves and arranged so that the initial letters of the leaves always formed a word.

The Erythraean Sibyl is believed to have made extremely precise statements regarding the coming of Christ. In Christian iconography, the Erythraean Sibyl is credited with prophesying the coming of the Redeemer, which prophecy was in the form of an acrostic whose initial letters spelled out "ΙΗΣΌΎΣ ΧΡΕΙΣΤΟΣ ΘΕΟΥ ΎΊΟΣ ΣΩΤΗΡ ΣΤΑΎΡΟΣ" ("Jesus Christ, God's Son, Savior, Cross). Examples were in mediaeval paintings in Salisbury Cathedral, and others are shown in the illustrations on this page.

See also
 Sibylline Oracles

Notes

References

Lactantius, Divinae institutiones I.6.8, 14
Augustine, De civitate dei xviii.23
Isidore, Etymologiae viii.8.1, 3, 4

Ancient Greek priestesses
Ancient Greek seers
Ionia
Sibyls
Chaldea